The Yguazú River is a river of Paraguay.

See also
List of rivers of Paraguay

References
Rand McNally, The New International Atlas, 1993.
 GEOnet Names Server

Rivers of Paraguay